Gerry Anderson's New Captain Scarlet (more commonly New Captain Scarlet or NCS) is a British computer generated action-adventure reboot of the 1967 Supermarionation series, Captain Scarlet and the Mysterons. Both series were produced by Gerry Anderson. As a nod to Supermarionation, the new series' computer animation was promoted as "Hypermarionation". It was the last show produced by Gerry Anderson.

The series premiered on the British ITV network in February 2005. Instead of having its own timeslot, each episode of Gerry Anderson's New Captain Scarlet was shown within the children's Saturday morning children TV Show, Ministry of Mayhem. Anderson was unhappy with this scheduling decision, claiming the show was ignored.

The lukewarm reception to the show resulted in shelving plans for future series. Radio Times said fans "felt the essence of the show had been pixelated away", while The Register called the series a "rehash".

Development
In 1999, Anderson supervised the production of a computer-animated test film, Captain Scarlet and the Return of the Mysterons, to explore the possibility of updating some of his 1960s Supermarionation series for a 21st-century audience. The working title was Captain Scarlet – The New Millennium. Produced by Moving Picture Company using a combination of Maya software and motion-capture technology, the film features Francis Matthews and Ed Bishop reprising their voice roles of Captains Scarlet and Blue. Set a few years after the Mysterons apparently cease hostilities against Earth, the film sees the reappearance of Captain Black, setting the stage for a revival of the war with Mars. The film was screened at a Fanderson convention in 2000 and a science lecture in 2001. It was released on home media in 2017. It was from the success of Captain Scarlet and the Return of the Mysterons which led to the development of Gerry Anderson's New Captain Scarlet. The new series' conventional motion capture technique was promoted as "Hypermarionation" as a nod to the original series' Supermarionation.

Broadcast
ITV premiered Gerry Anderson's New Captain Scarlet on the Saturday morning children's entertainment show Ministry of Mayhem. Episodes were split across two parts and shown with truncated opening titles.

Anderson later claimed: "They took my half-hour show, cut the titles off and cut it in half. It wasn't even listed so people who watched Ministry of Mayhem had to wait and watch all the nonsense going on before the first half. When it finished they didn't say there was a second half or when it was going to start. After they had shown all the episodes, legally it had to be cited as a repeat so it never had a premiere. It just broke my heart."

He interviews with Den of Geek and Big Finish, Anderson further dismissed Ministry of Mayhem as "a three-hour rubbish show", claimed parents had to "suffer" when NCS wasn't on-screen, that he was uncredited, and that Ministry of Mayhem "murdered the show".

Episodes were aired in the order they were completed and delivered to ITV, meaning that the series finale aired as the penultimate instalment. This is because an alternative episode had to be made after one was abandoned because Gerry Anderson thought it was too scary for younger children. On 29 September 2017 to celebrate the 50th anniversary of the original Captain Scarlet series, New Captain Scarlet was brought to North America via Amazon Video.

Synopsis
In the year 2068, peace on Earth is maintained by the Spectrum Organization, a super-efficient security group, headquartered in the vast floating aircraft carrier Skybase, which hovers on the edge of Earth's atmosphere. Spectrum is staffed by agents recruited from various military services, who are each assigned colour codenames to hide their true identities. Under the command of Colonel White, Spectrum has become the supreme peacekeeping force, maintaining a fleet of sophisticated vehicles for use by Spectrum field agents.

A mission to locate the source of mysterious signals originating from Mars unleashed the power of the Mysterons, a ruthless alien consciousness. When Spectrum Captains Scarlet and Black discovered the Mysteron city on Mars, Black mistook the intentions of a probe for a hostile offensive and opened fire, completely destroying the city. Using their power of retrometabolism (the ability to recreate matter), the Mysterons rebuilt their city, killed Black, and promised to crush Earth and its destructive people. This has taken the form of a war of nerves, with the Mysterons using their powers to influence people, vehicles and inanimate objects to fall under their control.

The Mysterons' primary Earth agent is Captain Black, recreated from the body of the original Spectrum agent. Captain Scarlet was also engineered to become an agent of destruction, but the Mysterons' hold over him was broken after he fell through a power conduit in the Skybase engineering section. Retaining the original man's memories, personality and loyalties, the new Captain Scarlet also retains the Mysteron ability to survive injuries that would prove fatal to any other person. Spectrum's personnel and facilities are now mainly mobilised to combat the threat of the Mysterons, with Captain Scarlet as their greatest weapon.

Rebooted characters

Spectrum

Main characters
Captain Scarlet (Paul Metcalfe): Leading Spectrum field agent. A 32-year-old dual nationality (American/British) former USAF and Special Forces officer, replaced by a virtually indestructible replicant. He was born in Winchester, United Kingdom. Paul's mother was Ann Brightman, a British astrophysicist, while his father, Tom Metcalfe, was an American pilot who later joined the International Space Agency. At the age of 10, Paul watched his father take humankind's first steps on Mars and vowed to follow in his historic footsteps. Scarlet was always quietly jealous of the relationship that had developed between his Spectrum partner and best friend Conrad Lefkon (designated by Spectrum as Captain Black) and Simone Giraudoux (Destiny Angel). However, once Black was Mysteronised, Scarlet's feelings for Destiny resurface and throughout the series the two start to fall in love. Scarlet has black hair and blue eyes, weighs 12 stone (76 kg) and is 6 ft 2in (188 cm) tall. Voiced by Wayne Forester, and motion capture performance by Oliver Hollis.
Captain Blue (Adam Svenson): 32-year-old American agent. A decorated former U.S. army officer and first class sportsman. He was born in Fort Hood in Texas, United States. Captain Blue is Captain Scarlet's second partner at Spectrum (after Captain Black dies) but only because of Colonel White's insistence. Initially, Blue did not want Scarlet as a partner because of Scarlet's history with the Mysterons, but as time went on Adam has become a good friend of Paul. Blue has blonde hair and blue eyes, weighs 12.1 stone (77 kg) and is 6 ft 1in (185 cm) tall. Throughout the series, it is hinted that he has romantic feelings for Serena Lewis (Lieutenant Green), though this is never taken further. Voiced by Robbie Stevens.
Destiny Angel (Simone Giraudoux): A 29-year-old dual nationality (French/British) Falcon Interceptor pilot, leader of the Spectrum Angels, a former USAF pilot and ISA astronaut. Destiny had a past relationship with Conrad Lefkon (Captain Black) something Paul Metcalf (Captain Scarlet) was always (secretly) jealous of because of his closeness to Destiny. However, once Black dies and is Mysteronised, she and Scarlet start to fall in love throughout the series. Destiny has blonde hair and blue eyes. She weighs 8 stone (51 kg) is 5 ft 9in (175 cm) and was born in Silicon Valley, California. Voiced by Emma Tate.
Colonel White (Sir Charles Grey): Spectrum's Commanding Officer, a 55-year-old British former director of MI6, knighted for services to the British Empire. He was born in Gloucestershire, United Kingdom. White has grey hair and blue eyes. He weighs 12.2 stone (77 kg) is 6 ft 0in (183 cm) and is married to Diana; who is a chairman of the Global Heritage Foundation. His daughter, Victoria, studies archeology. His interests include chess, fishing and fencing. He is also an expert in ancient military history. Voiced by Mike Hayley.
Lieutenant Green (Serena Lewis): Spectrum's Controller of Operations, a 27-year-old American former UN computer systems development technician; who carries a torch for Adam Svenson (Captain Blue) Green has brown hair and brown eyes. She weighs 8.3 stone (53 kg) is 5 ft 9in (175 cm) and was born in Houston, Texas, USA. She has a minor heart condition. Her father was a US astronaut, who died after an ill-fated mission to Jupiter. Her mother is a Trinidadian singer (reflecting the fact that, in the original series, Lieutenant Green was from Trinidad). In the second-series episode "Proteus" she is offered promotion to captain, but declines in order to continue working alongside White. Voiced by Jules de Jongh.
Doctor Gold (Dr Mason Frost): Main doctor on board Skybase. He was shown constantly throughout the series to have terrible bedside manners. Gold has grey hair and blue eyes, and wears glasses. His wife, Ula, is a veterinarian, and his daughter, Hattie, is a cosmetic dentistry scientist. Voiced by Nigel Plaskitt.
Lieutenant Silver (Bethany Craig): Skybase's second communication officer who rotates shifts with Lieutenant Green. She has auburn hair and blue-grey eyes. Australian. She appeared in a few episodes, and only spoke twice. Voiced by Emma Tate.
Chief Engineer: Featured in Episode "Swarm" and is posted in central control in Skybase. As a possible nod to Montgomery Scott from the Star Trek franchise, he has a Scottish accent.

Field agents
Captain Ochre (Elaine McGee): Irish Field Agent, 32 years old. Ochre has brown hair and blue eyes. She exhibits an excellent sense of humour. Introduced at the end of the first series, Ochre is the first and only female captain in the history of the franchise. She is a highly trained operative and an explosives expert who can handle heavy, computerized artillery. The character featured increasingly in the second series. Voiced by Julia Brahms.
Captain Grey (Iain Taggart): Scottish Field Agent who plays the bagpipes. He is 38, which would make him the oldest Spectrum Field Agent. He has brown hair and blue eyes. Voiced by Robbie Stevens.
Captain Magenta (Mario Moro): Italian Field Agent, aged 28.  A former military police officer. He has black hair and grey eyes. Voiced by Jeremy Hitchen.
Captain Indigo (John Roach): This character only appears three times throughout the entire series, and never speaks. He is black, with black hair and brown eyes. He has a beard.
Captain Brown (Ricky Nolan): This character only appears twice throughout the entire series, and never speaks. He is Caucasian, with brown hair.
Captain Orange (Unnamed): This character only appears once throughout the entire series (as part of the salute at Captain Black's funeral in Instrument of Destruction, Part 1), and, in that instance, does not speak. He is Caucasian, with black hair.

Spectrum Angels
Harmony Angel (Rebecca Drake): Harmony Angel is Destiny Angel's second-in-command if Destiny is busy with other duties or is injured. She is aged 26 has red hair, which is most likely dyed, and blue eyes. She has a heavy Southern States accent. Voiced by Jules de Jongh.
Rhapsody Angel (Caroline Foster-Finch): Rhapsody Angel was a member of the Fleet Air Arm, where she piloted rescue helicopters.  She is also a competent mechanic, and can often be found servicing her Falcon interceptor instead of allowing the technicians to do it. Aged 28, she has light brown hair tied in a plait, and an upper-class British accent. Voiced by Julia Brahms.
Melody Angel (Esther Jackson): Aged 25, she has brown hair and brown eyes. American. Voiced by Heather Tobias.
Symphony Angel (Yoko Inukai): Symphony Angel, age 24, has black hair and brown eyes. Japanese. Voiced by Jules de Jongh.

Mysterons
The Mysterons are the Alien enemies of Spectrum from the planet Mars. They have the power of retrometabolism, which means they can kill a person and rebuild them as a weapon under their control. Represented by two green circles when travelling over surfaces on Earth. Voiced by Mike Hayley.
Captain Black (Conrad Lefkon): Lead Mysteron agent, a 33-year-old American former Special Forces officer and leading Spectrum field agent, replaced by a virtually indestructible replicant. He used to be Captain Scarlet's best friend and partner and dated Destiny Angel before his Mysteronisation. Black has silver/black hair and hazel eyes. He weighs 11.3 stone (72 kg) is 6 ft 2in (188 cm) and was born in Brooklyn, New York, United States, although he speaks with a clipped British accent. Voiced by Nigel Plaskitt.

Reimagined Spectrum equipment

Skybase
Skybase is a 330 metre long command ship and the operational headquarters of Spectrum. It is permanently stationed above the clouds at 18,288 m. There are six main engines to keep the base positioned in the sky and a further ten engines designed to keep Skybase balanced. Skybase is home to the fleet of high-tech Spectrum vehicles, including the squadron of Falcon aircraft.

The Falcons are handled on Skybase using a unique magnetic control system. After landing on the magna-strip runway, a circular lift lowers the plane into the hangar. Robotic arms automatically re-fuel, and re-arm guns and missiles. Using this system means that the Falcons are always action ready.

Spectrum ground vehicles
Rhino TRU: (the SPV in Anderson's earlier series) - the Rhino TRU (Tactical Response Unit) is a heavy-duty attack vehicle, with an ultra-tough full armour. The Rhino is capable of high speed with the help of twin ram air booster jets at the rear. Built with ten wheels (two front sets, three rear sets), as well as with variable ride-height suspension, it is equipped with a multi-wheel steering system. This makes this cumbersome-looking vehicle easy to manoeuvre, on any kind of normal road as well as giving it good off-road performance. The Rhino is armed to the teeth with a large arsenal; two front mounted twin cannons firing explosive tipped rounds, armour piercing missiles, harpoon guns and magnetic clamp guns. There are also extendable battering rams on the front and rear. It is also equipped with evasive action anti-missiles launched from the rear. The Rhino is a sealed armoured vehicle, and access to the cabin is gained from the hatches on the vehicle's sides. Rear-facing seats on the retractable hatch openings receive the driver and passenger, and slide into position in front of the control panel. The vehicle can be driven from either side, the steering sliding into position to whoever needs to drive. Other hatches are situated on top of the vehicle and underneath it. The driver's cabin has multiple control screens to act as the drivers eyes, as there is no window. Equipped with all manner of computerised equipment needed for Spectrum work, the Rhino also comes with a security device allowing the driver to lock the vehicle by password and voice command, thus avoiding theft of the Rhino by an enemy if it should be left by itself. Whenever a Rhino is needed on a given mission, Spectrum will use the Albatross to transport the vehicle. The Albatross will land and the hatch beneath will open, a lift lowering to the ground to deposit the Rhino - with driver inside - ready to perform its mission.
Cheetah RRV (the SSC in Anderson's earlier series): The Cheetah is a rapid response vehicle. It can travel on its four wheels, but this car also features concealed wings and a tail fin that emerges from the boot (US: trunk). When powered by the jump jets in its wings and booster jets in the rear, the Cheetah is able to glide over obstructions with ease. In any mode the Cheetah, like its animal namesake, is capable of extremely rapid acceleration and deadly speed. It has a machine gun concealed inside the front grill, and also possesses star deflectors used to repel missiles. In the first series, these wings were only ever used for landings from Skybase or flying jumps. In the second series was the Cheetah shown to be able to take off from the ground under its own power.
Stallion Raid Bike: The Stallion is Spectrum's high-speed attack bike. With its pressurised canopy and wings it can be launched from Skybase. After leaving the runway, the Raid Bike freefalls, before deploying its wings in stages to glide. As the bike touches the ground, the canopy and wings disengage, the twin rear wheels grip the road and it blasts away. The rear wheels tilt independently of the body, keeping traction on the road. Extra stability is provided at high speed with front winglets. The Stallion Raid Bike is armed with two front mounted machine guns and two racks of missiles.

Spectrum aircraft
Albatross SDC: Amongst Spectrum's fleet of various craft, the Albatross is unique. Skybase carries two of these massive VTOL Deployment Aircraft, which are used to carry vehicles - mainly a Rhino - anywhere it is needed around the world. It can carry the heaviest weight, putting it down or picking it up on any ground, and in almost any conditions. The deployment system of the Albatross is unique. The cargo doors under the belly of the craft open, and unfold to form the landing feet. Then, the vehicle it carries is lowered by a lift from the Albatross' cargo, just as it finishes its landing procedure and approach. The Rhino can be deployed at the same second the Albatross makes its landing, and once it is out, the craft can take off immediately. This "drop-and-go" deployment, helped by the SlyFOXX anti-detection shielding with which the Albatross is equipped, makes the aircraft perfect for covert operations. However, due to its massiveness, it could attract visual attention, and therefore; the sturdy craft has been equipped with anti-missile Acoustic Disruptors - which makes it a hard target to hit, despite his size. While so massive, the Albatross nevertheless has remarkable swiftness in flight. Powerful pivoting twin multi-directional XBurn engines, set on each side of the craft, give it lifting capability, maneuverability, and in-flight velocity, even while carrying the heaviest of loads. Also unique is the launching method with which the Albatross is launched from Skybase. Set in its hangar over an airlock, the Albatross is held in place by clamps attached to its nose.  During launch sequence, the airlock doors open, and the pilot powers up the thrusters. Once ready for launched, the pilot releases the clamps, and the Albatross drops several meters from underneath Skybase, before the thrust of the engines stops its fall and it finally leaves Skybase to carry on its mission.
Falcon Interceptor: (the Angel Interceptor in Anderson's earlier series) - the five White Falcons of the Angel Squadron comprise the main force of Skybase's air power. The White Falcon is the Spectrum ATF or Advanced Tactical Fighter, piloted by the Angels. Each pilot has a designated craft, assigned to them, with her codename marking the fuselage. The same codename also appears on the front of each Angel's helmet. An ultimate all-around attack aircraft, the Falcon is a high-speed fighter plane powered by two of Halo pulsejets, with multi-step afterburners. State-of-the art designed wing-tip geometry and variable multi-plane flaps make the Falcon a supersonic strike fighter with high speed and agility, that can outmanoeuvre any other known fighter plane. Because of the incredible forces generated by the supersonic speeds and turning ability of the Falcon, the Angel pilots need to wear specifically designed and fitted G-suits for their protection against G-forces in flight. Armament comes in the form of twin 30 mm Tempest cannons, front and rear, firing titanium-tipped ammunition. Stowed within the main fuselage of the Falcon, a variety of air-to-air and air-to-ground missiles can be fired through internal tubes at any target. In the case of an emergency, the front portion of the plane, including the front canard wings, can disengage from the main body and become a self-powered escape pod. In the unlikely event of this pod failing or being damaged, there is still an ejector seat.
Swift Passenger Jet: (the SPJ in Anderson's earlier series) - the Swift is Spectrum's fast and comfortable passenger jet. Smooth handling and travel is provided by a sophisticated design where the whole body acts as one big wing. While designed primarily for relaxation and off-duty travel - it has extremely luxurious living and dining areas - the Swift can be converted into a fully operational control centre at a moment's notice.
Hummingbird Helicopter: The Hummingbird is Spectrum's multi-purpose helicopter. Its specially developed rotor blade works with a number of jet systems providing fantastic agility and flexible flying. Retractable inflatable floats situated within the nose and side-engine pods sit alongside a standard undercarriage. A high-powered gun is hidden within its belly. The Hummingbird is capable of rapid ascent and descent, flying manoeuvres and speeds.
Skyrider: The Skyrider is a single-person, high-speed, atmospheric transport for Spectrum personnel. It appears to use highly compact, dual rocket thrust units of relatively long duration. Atmospheric lift and directional control is provided using winglets, compact control surfaces and vectored thrust. It is used both on Earth and Mars.

Other craft

These craft are either Spectrum vehicles (used off-Earth) or vehicles not associated with Spectrum but used multiple times during the series;

Bison Alien Terrain Vehicle: A high-speed, multi-wheel, long-suspension surface rover for exo-atmospheric use. It is a sealed vehicle allowing the operators to drive helmetless during normal operation. Used on the surfaces of the Moon and Mars.
Spectrum Space Shuttle: Used to transport personnel from Earth to and from Spectrum bases on the Moon and Mars. The shuttle comprises an orbiter with the main drive section, and a lander using vectored thrust engine pods for planetary landings. The orbiter is capable of carrying multiple personnel, and has many facilities for long-duration inter-planetary flight such as a gym, a kitchen and sleeping quarters. The lander is capable of transporting a Bison rover vehicle for rapid EVA.
Mercury Shuttle: A rail-launched civil space launch system. This vehicle was intended to be an homage to one of the Anderson stable's earlier space vehicles, Fireball XL5, using a similar take-off method along a rail ramp.
Vampire Interceptor: the World Air Force's current high-performance interceptor aircraft. Matched only by the more advanced Spectrum Falcon Inteceptor, it has been used to deadly effect by the Mysterons on several occasions.
Druzynik Battlewagon: A massive, highly automated tank sporting a high-eV railgun cannon for main armament. Virtually unstoppable, with multiple offensive and defensive armaments.
Condor Freighter: The Condor is a civil multi-purpose, heavy-lift freight aircraft. The design incorporates an unusual, but effective tail ramp design, removing the need for hinged access to the load space whilst on the ground.

Episodes

Series overview

CGI test film
The 2005 CGI reboot of Captain Scarlet and the Mysterons, Gerry Anderson's New Captain Scarlet, was preceded by a short test film titled Captain Scarlet and the Return of the Mysterons and screened privately in 2000 and 2001. The film was finally released to home video as part of the Complete Blu-ray set in 2017.

Series 1 (2005)
{{Episode table |background=#AE1D1A |overall=5 |series=5 |title=22 |director=20 |writer=20 |airdate=18 |prodcode=6 |episodes=

{{Episode list | LineColor = AE1D1A
|EpisodeNumber=6
|EpisodeNumber2=6
|Title=Mercury Falling
|DirectedBy=Dominic Lavery
|WrittenBy=Phil Ford
|OriginalAirDate=
|ProdCode=4
|ShortSummary=
Captain Blue and Destiny Angel pilot the International Space Agency shuttle Mercury on a top secret mission into space. They are to deploy a new satellite into Earth orbit, which will provide early warning of an imminent attack by identifying Mysteron energy on Mars. However, just as Mercury achieves orbit the shuttle's controls are taken over by an outside force, and its systems lock onto a new flight path. Spectrum then receives a transmission from an unidentified extortionist who demands a ransom of $50 million in diamonds or else they will initiate Mercury'''s re-entry over North America and crash the shuttle onto Washington DC. Captain Scarlet must discover the identity of the blackmailer before Captain Black can turn the situation to his (and the Mysterons') advantage and send the craft on a collision course with the White House.
}}

}}

Series 2 (2005)

Home media
DVD
Both Series 1 and 2 are available on DVD in the UK, the latter being produced under the ITV DVD banner. Individual volumes are available with three or four episodes on each disk and box sets of all volumes from both series are available separately. The DVD case for Series 2 gives a completely inaccurate description of the episode "Grey Skulls". The description mentions Scarlet taking a camping holiday with his sister and her son when they are attacked by the Mysterons. They then seek shelter in a house owned by an old toymaker and collector (plans were for him to resemble Gerry Anderson) but the Mysterons then bring to life all the toys in the house with murderous intentions. This episode (called "House of Dolls") was originally planned and scripted but eventually scrapped, as it was considered too scary for small children, and may not have been shown by broadcasters, so it was replaced by "Grey Skulls". However, the script was given a live performance by the cast at the 2006 Fanderson convention Sector 25 (with a guest appearance by Shane Rimmer as the toymaker). Series 2 is rated 12, due to some rather blunt violence that was not shown in the CITV version. It is also worth noting that the episode in Series 2 known as "Duel" has the wrong name on the box for the holiday resort. It is called Serendipity on the episode summaries, but was called Tranquility in the episode itself. Furthermore, the episode order for the last disc of the series 2 DVD is incorrect. The final episode of the series "Dominion" and the aforementioned "Grey Skulls", which was the penultimate episode, should be watched in reverse order. As of early 2013 the series (Sony Licensed) has yet to achieve DVD release in North America, making it one of only a handful of Anderson series not to receive home video release outside the UK.

Volumes

Boxsets

Blu-ray
In December 2014 it was announced on Gerry Anderson's official site that the HD masters of the series which were thought to be lost were located and hopefully to be released on Blu-ray in the future. On 6 May 2017, Network announced they were going to release a new DVD of Dick Spanner and New Captain Scarlet'' on Blu-ray for 4 September 2017 to coincide with the 50th anniversary of the original series.

Boxsets

References

External links

Official website – via Internet Archive 

Gerry Anderson's New Captain Scarlet  at citv.com

 
2000s British animated television series
2000s British children's television series
2000s British science fiction television series
2005 British television series debuts
2005 British television series endings
Animated television series reboots
Aviation television series
British children's science fiction television series
British children's animated action television series
British children's animated space adventure television series
British computer-animated television series
English-language television shows
ITV children's television shows
Television series by Sony Pictures Television
Television series produced at Pinewood Studios